Top Spot is a feature film written and directed by Tracey Emin. It was produced by Michael Winterbottom and Revolution Films. It starred Elizabeth Crawford, Katie Foster Barnes and Helen Laker. It was shown at the London Film Festival. The film is named after a disco in Margate, Emin's home town.

References 

2004 films
British drama films
2000s British films